Bellentre is a former commune in the Savoie department in the region of Auvergne-Rhône-Alpes in south-eastern France. On 1 January 2016, it was merged into the new commune of La Plagne Tarentaise.

Geography
Situated in the Tarentaise Valley, the commune stretches over villages of Montchavin Les Coches and parts of the ski resort of La Plagne.

Neighbouring communes are Landry to the north-east, Les Chapelles, Bourg-Saint-Maurice and Valezan to the north, Mâcot-la-Plagne to the west, Champagny-en-Vanoise to the south and Peisey-Nancroix to the east.

See also
Communes of the Savoie department

References

External links

 Map of communes in Savoie

Former communes of Savoie